Daşbulaq (until 2004, Qorelsk) is a village in the Gadabay Rayon of Azerbaijan. It forms part of the municipality of Qaradağ.

History
Along with nearby Novoivanovka and the bigger town of Saratovka, Daşbulaq village was originally founded some time after the 1830s by Russian 'Old Believers', under the name Gorelsk (Горельск).

References 

Populated places in Gadabay District